Andreas Frisk (born January 5, 1984) is a Swedish professional ice hockey defenceman, currently playing for Vålerenga of the Norwegian GET-ligaen.

Andreas played for AIK until he left for Vålerenga in 2008. He spent almost two years in Norway, playing part of his second season for IK Comet. He then returned to Sweden to play for Örebro HK, which he stayed with for three seasons, before returning to AIK in 2012.

Career statistics

Regular season and playoffs

References
http://www.eliteprospects.com/player.php?player=535

External links
 

1984 births
AIK IF players
Diables Rouges de Briançon players
IK Comet players
Linköping HC players
Living people
Örebro HK players
Swedish ice hockey defencemen
Vålerenga Ishockey players
VIK Västerås HK players